(), referred to in the Colognian dialect as  or  and in common parlance as Dicker Pitter (i.e. "Fat or Big Peter"), is the largest bell in Cologne Cathedral. It was cast in 1923 by Heinrich Ulrich in Apolda and hangs in the belfry of the south tower.

History 
When the bell was cast in 1923, the bell-founder refused to take German marks as a payment because of the hyper-inflation. Instead the Cathedral Chapter paid 5000 US dollars.
The predecessor of the bell was the "Emperor's Bell" (orig. In 1918 it was melted down, because of the poor sound quality and the inadequate tone. Its metal was used for war purposes. During its thirty-year life it had regularly been put out of service to attempt to fix the inappropriate sound. Because of this the bell was nicknamed Große Schweigerin, or "big silence".

The crack 
It was welded in 1956 by the company Lachenmeyer from Nördlingen. After repairs, the bell received a new, lighter clapper (approx. ), and it was rotated approximately 20 degrees so that the clapper did not strike the damaged area.

The broken clapper 
On 6 January 2011, the clapper broke and dropped on the floor below. The four earthquake sensors in the cathedral registered it. As it could not be repaired, a new one was cast and was installed in December of the same year. It was later discovered that the accident happened because the clapper had not been correctly installed in the 1950s, thus increasing wear, which consequently led to material degradation. 

It was installed on 2 December 2011, and was first rung on 7 December 2011. The workers installed two new electric ringing engines (500 rpm), who harmonized with the new clapper. The old engines worked with 750 rpm.

In 2016, it was discovered that uneven striking of the clapper meant that the “Dicke Pitter” was no longer emitting its customary sound. The Cologne University of Applied Sciences and the cathedral construction authority developed a new mount. In addition, a new corrosion protection product was developed by Dörken MKS-Systeme.

Ringing times 
The bell is only rung on special occasions and on solemnities. The declaration or death of an Archbishop of Cologne or of a Pope, as well as the investiture of a new archbishop  also warrant tolling St. Peter. All bells of the cathedral rang on the eve of 28 March 1936, a Friedensappell ("peace appeal") of Hitler, which he made in Cologne due to the Reichstag elections. Likewise, the St. Petersglocke declared the end of World War II above the ruins of the city of Cologne in 1945, and in 1990 the reunification of Germany. 
As a rule, St. Petersglocke rings solo for ten minutes before all the others, which join in accordance with the general ringing ordinance. However, not all South Tower bells will be rung every time. For the Feast of the Immaculate Conception bells 1–6 are rung and for the Christmas Eve Vigil bells 1–3.

Gallery

References 

Individual bells
Tourist attractions in Cologne
Buildings and structures completed in 1923